Meridagena is a genus of moths of the family Tortricidae. It consists of only one species, Meridagena bicerithium, which is found in Venezuela.

The wingspan is 13 mm. The wings are brown with indistinct darker transverse lines in the posterior half. The hindwings are dirty whitish in the basal part, but brownish on the periphery.

Etymology
The generic name is a combination of the state of Mérida and Greek genos (meaning descendant). The species name refers to the structure of the transtilla and is derived from bi (meaning two) and cerithium/Greek keration (meaning a small horn).

See also
List of Tortricidae genera

References

External links
tortricidae.com

Euliini
Monotypic moth genera
Taxa named by Józef Razowski
Moths of South America
Tortricidae genera